Duncan McMartin Jr. (1776 – October 3, 1837) was an American politician from New York.

Life
He lived in Broadalbin, then in Montgomery Co., now in Fulton County. He married Margaret (1778–1835), and they had several children.

He was a member of the New York State Assembly (Hamilton & Montgomery Co.) in 1819.

He was a member of the New York State Senate (Eastern D.) from 1820 to 1822, sitting in the 43rd, 44th and 45th New York State Legislatures.

He was again a member of the State Senate (4th D.) from 1827 to 1830, sitting in the 50th, 51st, 52nd and 53rd New York State Legislatures.

He was buried at a cemetery now located in Perth, a town formed after McMartin's death, and which includes an area formerly belonging to Broadalbin.

Sources
The New York Civil List compiled by Franklin Benjamin Hough (pages 124, 127f, 143, 194 and 290; Weed, Parsons and Co., 1858)

External links
Perth Cemetery records

1776 births
1837 deaths
People from Broadalbin, New York
Members of the New York State Assembly
New York (state) state senators
New York (state) Democratic-Republicans